Kelly Jampu (born October 22, 1986) is a Papua New Guinean footballer who plays as a defender.

References

External links 
 
 

Living people
1986 births
Papua New Guinean footballers
Papua New Guinea international footballers
Association football defenders
2012 OFC Nations Cup players